Hanguo may refer to:
Han (state) 
South Korea